The Colorado House of Representatives is the lower house of the Colorado General Assembly, the state legislature of the U.S. state of Colorado. The House is composed of 65 members from an equal number of constituent districts, with each district having 75,000 people.  Representatives are elected to two-year terms, and are limited to four consecutive terms in office, but can run again after a four-year respite.

The Colorado House of Representatives convenes at the State Capitol building in Denver.

Committees
The House have 11 current committees of reference:
House Agriculture, Livestock, and Water Committee
House Appropriations Committee
House Business Affairs and Labor
House Education
House Energy and Environment Committee
House Finance Committee
House Health and Insurance Committee
House Judiciary Committee
House Public and Behavioral Health and Human Services Committee
House State, Civic, Military, and Veterans Affairs Committee
House Transportation and Local Government Committee Committee

Current composition

Leaders

Members

Past composition of the House of Representatives

See also

Outline of Colorado
Index of Colorado-related articles
State of Colorado
Law and government of Colorado
Governor of Colorado
Lieutenant Governor of Colorado
Colorado General Assembly
Colorado Senate

 List of Colorado state legislatures
Courts of Colorado
Colorado Supreme Court
United States of America
United States Congress
United States congressional delegations from Colorado
List of United States senators from Colorado
Colorado's congressional districts
List of United States representatives from Colorado

References

External links
Colorado General Assembly
Video of proceedings from 2013 (at Archive.org)

1876 establishments in Colorado

State lower houses in the United States
Colorado General Assembly